This table displays the top-rated primetime television series of the 1991–92 season as measured by Nielsen Media Research.

References

1991 in American television
1992 in American television
1991-related lists
1992-related lists
Lists of American television series